Four non-coding small RNAs containing a Fur box-like (ferric uptake regulator) sequence were identified by bioinformatics analysis in Aggregatibacter actinomycetemcomitans HK1651 called JA01-JA04. The transcription of sRNAs was confirmed by Northern blot. Fur binding was demonstrated to each sRNA promoter, and  that transcription of the sRNAs was decreased in presence of iron and increased by iron limitation. JA03 may have the ability to regulate biofilm formation. JA01 is  conserved only among A. actinomycetemcomitans. JA02 is present in both A. actinomycetemcomitans and P. multocida. JA 03 and JA04  are most widely conserved and have orthologues across many Pasteurellaceae. HrrF RNA is another Fur-regulated sRNA conserved among  the Pasteurcellaceae.

See also 
 RhyB RNA
 PrrF RNA
 NrrF RNA

References

Non-coding RNA